Marr RFC is a rugby union team based in Troon, Ayrshire, Scotland.

History

Marr play their home games at Fullarton estate and has done since early 1970s. Until then it had used the school grounds since the club's formation in the 1940s. It was originally for the former pupils of Marr College, a secondary school in Troon, and there is still a close affiliation between the club and local high school. They play in the distinct colours of purple, gold and green. Over the last few years Marr has had a revival mainly due to the introduction of former Scotland 'A' cap Craig Redpath as head coach and latterly Former Ayr players Paul Burke and Stephen Adair as additional coaches.

Starting with the 2010–11 season, Marr began a run of four successive league title wins which promoted the club from the sixth to the second tier of Scottish club rugby for the 2014–15 season. They were promoted in the 2016–17 season and for the 2017–18 season they will play in the Scottish Premiership.

The side topped the Scottish Premiership in season 2019–20, but the SRU declared the season null and void as it ended prematurely when the coronavirus pandemic broke out.

Sides

They currently have three senior sides competing in various leagues.

Honours

 Glasgow City Sevens
 Champions (1): 2018
 Drumpellier Sevens
 Champions: 1974
 Stirling Sevens
 Champions: 1973
 Greenock Sevens
 Champions: 2017
 Tennents National Division 1 
Champions: 2016–17, 2018–19
 Ardrossan Sevens
 Champions: 1982
 Musselburgh Sevens
 Champions: 2022
 Hamilton Sevens
 Champions: 2022

Notable former players

 Darcy Rae, Glasgow Warriors and Scotland 
 Peter Brown, former captain of Scotland
 Bill Cuthbertson, Scottish international

References

Sources

 Massie, Allan A Portrait of Scottish Rugby (Polygon, Edinburgh)

Scottish rugby union teams
Rugby union in South Ayrshire